Traveller Book 8: Robots is a supplement published by Game Designers' Workshop (GDW) in 1986 for the science fiction role-playing game Traveller.

Contents
This book explains how self-aware robots can be designed and used both as player characters and as non-player characters for Traveller. The books gives details of the history of robots, types of robots, who builds them, the robot brain, a universal description system, new character skills for robots, and how to design a robot.

Publication history
GDW first published the science fiction role-playing game Traveller in 1977, and followed that with dozens of supplements and adventures, including Traveller Book 8: Robots in 1986, a 56-page digest-sized softcover book written by Joe D. Fugate, Sr., with illustrations by Steve Venters.

Reception
Marcus L. Rowland reviewed Traveller Alien Module 8: Robots for White Dwarf #85, and stated that "The rules are clear and reasonably concise, and suggest a few interesting scenario ideas. At 56 pages this isn't the most useful rules supplement for a Traveller campaign, it's more for completists and GMs."

See also
Classic Traveller Books

References

Role-playing game supplements introduced in 1986
Traveller (role-playing game) supplements